The Herren Tunnel (in German: Herrentunnel) is a German 780 metre-long road-tunnel underneath the river Trave. It is part of the national highway Bundesstrasse 75, connecting Lübeck and Travemünde. It is Germany's second toll tunnel, and was opened on 26 August 2005.

The tunnel replaces a bridge.  Cyclists who could use the bridge regularly are not allowed to cycle through the tunnel and have to detour via Bad Schwartau or use a free shuttle bus with long waiting times through the tunnel.

References

External links
Mautinfo Herren Tunnel
Herren Tunnel

Road tunnels in Germany
Toll tunnels in Europe
Buildings and structures in Lübeck
Transport in Lübeck
Tunnels completed in 2005